Dunca is a surname. Notable people with the surname include:

 Rodica Dunca (born 1965), Romanian artistic gymnast
 Nicolae Dunca (1837–1862), officer of the Union Army